Meadowcrest is an unincorporated community in Citrus County, Florida, United States. It is located in the western part of the county, to the east of Crystal River, between State Road 44 and County Road 486 (West Norvelle Bryant Highway).

External links
 Meadowcrest Community Association

Unincorporated communities in Citrus County, Florida
Unincorporated communities in Florida
Planned communities in Florida